The 1888 Victorian Football Association season was the 12th season of the Australian rules football competition.

The premiership was won by the South Melbourne Football Club. It was the third premiership in the club's history, and the first out of a sequence of three consecutive premierships won from 1888 to 1890.

Association membership 
Prior to 1888, the Williamstown and South Williamstown clubs amalgamated, with the merged entity known as Williamstown. The South Williamstown club had been established in 1886 as the result of a dispute between the Williamstown Football Club and Williamstown Cricket Club over the use of the Williamstown Cricket Ground for football; this schism persisted for two seasons, with unsatisfactory outcomes, including poor onfield performances resulting from the fact that Williamstown, which was then a small fishing village, could not supply enough talented players to sustain two competitive senior teams. The football and cricket clubs came to agreeable terms over the 1887-88 summer, and formed a single entity which fielded one senior cricket team and one senior football team, both of which played at the cricket ground. The amalgamated club went on to finish third for the season.

As a result of these two amalgamations, the size of the Association contracted from eighteen senior teams to sixteen in 1889.

The borough of Hotham was renamed North Melbourne, and the Hotham Football Club was accordingly renamed the North Melbourne Football Club.

1888 VFA ladder 
For the first time, the senior clubs were formally ranked into a full premiership ladder of the type understood in the modern era. The teams were ranked under a new system designed by Theo Marshall:
 For all senior matches played against other Association clubs, four premiership points were awarded for a win and two for a draw.
 Teams did not play a uniform number of premiership matches during the season. Each team's premiership points were adjusted upwards proportionally to match that of the club which played the most matches during the season – e.g., in this season, South Melbourne played 19 matches and Port Melbourne played 22 matches, the most of any club; so, South Melbourne's tally of premiership points was increased by a factor of 22/19.
 After this adjustment, teams were ranked in order of adjusted points, and the top team was awarded the premiership.
 Teams were required to play at least eighteen senior games to qualify for the premiership.

This system meant that for the first time, the premiership was an official title conferred and endorsed by the Association, replacing the previous approach whereby the premier club was determined by an unofficial consensus but was conventionally understood to be won by the club which suffered the fewest defeats for the season – a system which was flawed because it treated wins and draws as equal in value. The Association also instituted the awarding of a premiership cap – in the Association's navy blue and gold colours – to players of the premiership team.

The full ladder is shown below. Of the sixteen clubs, Footscray, University and the three Ballarat-based clubs failed to play the minimum eighteen matches required to qualify for the premiership; they are still shown ranked by adjusted points, but are not given a finishing position.

Notable events 
 The struggling University club failed to contest its last three scheduled matches, and dropped out of the VFA and folded at the end of the season.

See also 
 Victorian Football Association/Victorian Football League History (1877-2008)
 List of VFA/VFL Premiers (1877-2007)
 History of Australian rules football in Victoria (1853-1900)

References 

Victorian Football League seasons
Vfa Season, 1888